Leavitt may refer to:

People
Leavitt (surname)

Places
United States
Leavitt, California
Leavitt Lake, a lake in Minnesota
Leavitt Peak, California
Leavitt Township, Michigan
Leavittsburg, Ohio
Leavittstown, New Hampshire, name later changed to Effingham, New Hampshire

Canada
Leavitt, Alberta

Extraterrestrial
Leavitt (crater)
5383 Leavitt, asteroid

Structures
United States
Leavitt Area High School, Turner, Maine
Blazo-Leavitt House, Parsonsfield, Maine
James Leavitt House, Waterboro Center, Maine
Thomas Leavitt House, Bunkerville, Nevada

See also
Levett
Lovett (disambiguation)